Denk may refer to:

People
Jeremy Denk (born 1970), American classical pianist
Michael K. Denk, Canadian professor of chemistry
Paula Denk (1908–1978), German actress
Ralph Denk (born 1973), German cyclist and cycling manager
Ulrike Denk (born 1964), German Olympic athlete 
Winfried Denk (born 1957), German physicist

Other
Denk (band), an Austrian rock band
DENK (political party), a Dutch political party

See also
Denker, a name
Denke, a name